Gökçeyaka can refer to:

 Gökçeyaka, Çameli
 Gökçeyaka, Emirdağ
 Gökçeyaka, Finike
 Gökçeyaka, Yeşilova